Sonora Review is a biannual graduate student-run literary magazine that was established in the fall of 1980. Sonora Review publishes fiction, non-fiction, and poetry, as well as interviews, book reviews, and art. Each issue is produced by graduate student volunteers in the Creative Writing Department at the University of Arizona. Former staff members include Antonya Nelson, Robert Boswell, Richard Russo, Tony Hoagland, and David Foster Wallace. Work originally printed in the Sonora Review has appeared in Best of the West and Best American Poetry, and has won O. Henry Awards and Pushcart Prizes. The editor-in-chief is Kevin Mosby.

Sonora Review Fiction Contest Winners
Each spring, the magazine awards a fiction prize. Outside judges choose the winners, who each receive $1,000 and are published in the magazine.
2016–Molly Antopol, judge; Sean Gill, winner ("Beyond the Terminus, Beyond") 
2017–Brian Evenson, judge; Kate Berson, winner (“Luz, Milagro”) 
2018–Charles Yu, judge; Silvia Park, winner ("shift+delete") 
2019–R. O. Kwon, judge; Julie Kim, winner ("The Egg") 
2020–Rebecca Makkai, judge; Omer Friedlander, winner ("Scheherazade and Radio Station 97.2 FM")

See also
List of literary magazines

References

External links
 

Biannual magazines published in the United States
Literary magazines published in the United States
Magazines established in 1980
Magazines published in Arizona
Mass media in Tucson, Arizona
Student magazines published in the United States
University of Arizona